Anandji Virji Shah  (born 2 March 1933) is an Indian music director. Together with his brother he formed the Kalyanji-Anandji duo, and won the 1975 Filmfare Award for Best Music Director, for Kora Kagaz. In 1992, Anandji Shah received the Padma Shri, India's fourth-highest civilian honour.

Life
Anandji was born to Virji Shah on 2nd March 1933. Their father was a Kutchi businessman who had migrated from Kutch to Bombay to start a kirana (provision store). His younger brother and sister-in-law are the husband-and-wife duo Babla & Kanchan. The two brothers began to learn music from a music teacher. One of their four grandparents was a folk musician of some eminence. They spent most of their formative years in the hamlet of Girgaum (a district in Bombay) in the Marathi and Gujarati areas.

External links
 

Living people
Filmfare Awards winners
People from Kutch district
1933 births
Recipients of the Padma Shri in arts
Hindi film score composers